Lojain Omran (born ) is a Saudi Arabian television presenter and social media personality. She presents a show on a channel in Bahrain and is a cast member on the Netflix original reality television show, Dubai Bling (2022).

Early and personal life
Omran was born in Jubail, Eastern Province, and had a career in banking before moving into television. Her younger sister is actress Aseel Omran.

She learned to drive when she moved to Bahrain in 2001, and in 2008, while living in Dubai, bought a Porsche Carrera which she had resprayed in pink with silver glitter and the slogans "Girls Rule" and "Angel".

Career
Omran's TV programmes before Good Morning Arabs! included The Situation with Lojain, Ya Hala, Around the Gulf and World of Eve.

Forbes included her at number 55 in their 2017 list of 100 Arabic celebrities, one of five Saudi people listed.

She is reported to have 5.4 million followers on social media, and has been described as "one of the most influential media personalities in the Middle East". 

Omran has more than 10.3 million followers on her Instagram account,  and as one of the five "most popular fashion and beauty influencers" affecting millennials in the UAE. Gulf Business listed her as number 87 in its Arab Power List 2018, describing her as an "Influencer / TV Host".

References

External links

1970s births
Living people
Saudi Arabian television presenters 
Saudi Arabian women television personalities